Pablo Obregón (c. 1796 – 10 September 1828) was a young Mexican colonel in the Army of the Three Guarantees who served as minister plenipotentiary of Mexico to the United States from 18 November 1824 until his death by suicide on 10 September 1828.

Notes and references

1796 births
1828 deaths
Ambassadors of Mexico to the United States
Members of the Chamber of Deputies (Mexico)
Military personnel from Guanajuato
People from León, Guanajuato
Suicides by hanging in Pennsylvania
Suicides in Philadelphia